Friction Spinning or Dref Spinning is a textile technology that suitable for spinning coarse counts of yarns and technical core-wrapped yarns. Dref yarns are bulky, with low tensile strength making them suitable for blankets and mop yarns, they can be spun from asbestos, carbon fibres and makes filters was water systems. Yarns such as Rayon and Kevlar can be spun using this method.  The technology was developed around 1975 by Dr. Ernst Fehrer.

Spinning technologies
There are three current technologies used today for spinning fibres: 
Roving spinning which uses the legacy ring -spinning technology of the twentieth century, 
Open end, Rotor or Break Spinning used for high quality threads 
Dref friction spinning for other yarns.  
Friction spinning is the fastest of all these techniques though the yarn is irregular and bulkier, making it suitable only for some applications.

Yarn formation in friction spinning system
The mechanism of yarn formation consists of three distinct operations: feeding of fibres, fibre integration and twist insertion.

Feeding
The individual fibres are transported by air currents and deposited in the spinning zone. The mode of fibre feed has a particular effect on fibre extent and fibre configuration in yarn and on its properties. There are two methods of fibre feed:
Direct feed 
The fibres are fed directly onto the rotating fibre mass that outer part of the yarn tail. 
Indirect feed.
The fibres are first accumulated on the in-going roll and then transferred to the yarn tail.

Fibres integration
The fibres assembles through a feed tube onto a yarn core/tail within the shear field, is provided by two rotating spinning drums and the yarn core is in between them. The shear causes sheath fibres to wrap around the yarn core. The fibre orientation is highly dependent on the decelerating fibres arriving at the assembly point through the turbulent flow. The fibres in the friction drum have two probable methods for integration of incoming fibres to the sheath. One method, the fibre assembles completely on to perforated drum before their transfer to the rotating sheath. In the other method, fibres are laid directly on to rotating sheath.

Twist insertion
There has been much research on the twisting process in friction spinning. In friction spinning, the fibres are applied twist with more or less one at a time without cyclic differentials in tension in the twisting zone. Therefore, fibre migration may not take place in friction spun yarns. The mechanism of twist insertion for core type friction spinning and open end friction spinning are different, which are described below.

Twist insertion in core-type friction spinning
In core type friction spinning, the core, made of a filament or a bundle of staple fibres, is false twisted by the spinning drum. The sheath fibres are deposited on the false twisted core surface and are wrapped helically over the core with varying helix angles. It is believed that the false twist in the core gets removed once the yarn is emerged from the spinning drums, so that this yarn has a virtually twist-less core. However, it is quite possible for some amount of false twist to remain in the fact that the sheath entraps it during yarn formation in the spinning zone.

Twist insertion in open end type friction spinning
In open end type friction spinning the fibres in the yarn are integrated as a stacked cone. The fibres in the surface of the yarn found more compact and good packing density than the axial fibres in the yarn.

The yarn tail can be considered as a loosely constructed conical mass of fibres, formed at the nip of the spinning drums. It is of very porous and lofty structure. The fibres rotating at very high speed.

History
Dr. Ernst Fehrer (1919-2001) invented and patented the DREF friction spinning process in 1973. He had begun work on the development of this alternative to mule, ring and rotor open end spinning with the objective of surmounting the physico-mechanical limits on capacity in yarn engineering, enhancing the production speeds. The system was name using letters from his honorific and name. His company 
Dr. Ernst Fehrer AG, Textilmaschinenfabrik, was based in Linz-Leonding, Austria. He died in December 2000 at age 81 having produced more than 1000 patents.

Fehrer began his career in research, development and inventing at age 14 writing his first patent at 18. He developed a high-speed needle loom with counterbalancing technology as well as the "DREF"system. In 1988, Fehrer received the TAPPI Nonwovens Division Award for his contributions to nonwovens manufacturing technology, and in 1994 Fehrer received Textile World's first Lifetime Achievement Award.

Development
The Dref I was in development in 1975; a three-head machine, and in 1977 the first DREF 2 for the coarse yarn count range came onto the market. In view of its success, Dr. Fehrer then created the DREF 3, which was designed for the medium yarn count range and made its debut at the ITMA ’79 in Hanover, before entering serial production in 1981.

New generations of the DREF 2 followed in 1986 and 1994 and the DREF 3/96 was launched at the ITMA in Milan. The 1999 ITMA in Paris witnessed the arrival of the DREF 2000, the first of which was sold prior to the fair. Full production of the DREF 2000 commenced in the autumn of 1999 in co-ordination with presentations at the ATME, USA and the SIMAT in Argentina. In 2001, the DREF 2000 also went on display in Asia at the ITMA Singapore and in Central America at the EXINTEX, Mexico.

Fehrer entered co-operations with professional textile companies to develop the technology; Rieter AG in Switzerland and Oerlikon Schlafhorst in Germany.  With this co-operation the last machine developed by DREF was the DREF 3000, which was available for testing in the new facility in Linz, Austria in 2001. Saurer AG purchased Fehrer AG in 2005. DREFCORP, along with all its associated patents and intellectual property was purchased in 2007 by Nordin Technologies – a Malaysian company – that continues to develop and manufacture DREF 2000 and DREF 3000 machines as well as continuing to serve the international market with parts for the original Fehrer Dref II, Dref III, Dref 2000 and Dref 3000 friction spinning machines.

Yarn properties

Friction spun yarns DREF yarns have bulky appearance (100-140% bulkier than the ring spun yarns). The twist is not uniform and found with loopy yarn surface. Friction spun yarns with a high %age of core have a high stiffness. Friction spun yarns are usually weak as compared to other yarns. The yarns possess only 60% of the tenacity of ring-spun yarns and about 90% of rotor spun-yarns. The increased twist and wrapping of the sheath over the core improve the cohesion between the core and sheath and within the sheath.

The breaking elongation ring, rotor and friction spun yarns have been found to be equal. Better relative tenacity efficiency is achieved during processing of cotton on rotor and friction spinning as compared to ring spinning system.

Depending on the type of fibre, the differences in strength of these yarns differ in magnitude. It has been reported that 100% polyester yarns, this strength deficiency is 32% whereas for 100% viscose yarns, it ranges from 0-25%. On the other hand, in polyester-cotton blend, DREF yarns perform better than their ring-spun counterparts. A 70/30% blend yarn has been demonstrated to be superior in strength by 25%. The breaking strength of ring yarns to be maximum followed by the rotor yarn and then 50/50 core-sheath DREF-3 yarn.

DREF yarns have been seen to be inferior in terms of unevenness, imperfections, strength variability and hairiness. DREF yarns occupy an intermediate position between ring-spun and rotor spun yarns as far as short hairs and total hairiness s concerned. For hairs longer than 3mm, the friction spun yarns are more hairy than the ring spun yarns. Rotor spun yarns show the least value in both the values. DREF yarns are most irregular in terms of twist and linear density while ring spun yarns are most even.

Textile technologists have studied the frictional behaviour of ring, rotor, friction spun yarns of 59 and 98.4 Tex spun from cotton, polyester, viscose fibres, with varying levels of twist. The yarn to yarn and yarn to guide roller friction was measured at different sliding speeds and tension ratios. However, for polyester fibres, the rotor spun yarn showed highest friction, followed by friction and ring spun yarns.

See also
Mule spinning
Ring spinning
Spinning
Open End Spinning
Carding
Cotton-Spinning Machinery

References

External links

 

Spinning
Textile machinery